Gary Paul "Doc" Dillon (born May 16, 1943) is an American politician in the state of Indiana.

Dillon was born in South Bend, Indiana. He attended Wabash College and the Indiana University School of Medicine and is a dermatologist. He served in the Indiana House of Representatives from 1998 to 2002 and in the Indiana State Senate from 2002 to 2010. He resides in Columbia City, Indiana.

References

1943 births
Living people
Republican Party Indiana state senators